The Longwood Drive District is a historic district in Chicago, Illinois. The houses along Longwood Drive in the Beverly neighborhood were built beginning in 1873 by various architects. Longwood was named for a long copse of trees that ran along the lee side of the hill where the rest of Beverly is located. The area was designated a Chicago Landmark on November 13, 1981. The Longwood Drive has a mixture of different styles of architecture, such as Italianate, Carpenter Gothic, Queen Anne, Shingle, Prairie School, and Renaissance Revival.

References

Historic districts in Chicago
Chicago Landmarks

The Longwood Drive District extends twelve blocks from 9800 to 11000 S. Longwood Dr. and from 10400 to 10700 S. Seeley Ave.